

Senior Division

Senior 1

Senior 1A

Senior 1B

References 
http://lsl.ie/league-table/?id_division=161

Leinster Senior League (association football)